L'Orchestra African Fiesta, often known simply as African Fiesta, was a Congolese soukous band started by Tabu Ley Rochereau and Dr. Nico Kasanda in 1963.

History 
Tabu Ley and Dr. Nico were originally members of the seminal band Grand Kalle et l'African Jazz. They left African Jazz and started their own group, African Fiesta, with which they helped elevate the genre of African rumba into the genre now known as Soukous.

Tension between Tabu Ley and Dr. Nico led to a split in 1965, with Tabu Ley renaming the band African Fiesta National and Dr. Nico forming African Fiesta Sukisa. Dr. Nico withdrew from the music scene in the mid-1970s. 

Tabu Ley and African Fiesta National continued to dominate the Congolese musical scene. By 1970, their records routinely sold in the millions. African Fiesta National served as a breeding ground for such future African music stars as vocalist Sam Mangwana.

In 1970, Tabu Ley formed Orchestre Afrisa International, Afrisa being a combination of Africa and Éditions Isa, his Record label.

Discography
Contributing artist
 The Rough Guide to Congo Gold (2008, World Music Network)
 Authenticité volume 1

Notes

References

Democratic Republic of the Congo musical groups
Soukous